Ethmia deconfiturella is a moth in the Ethmiidae family. It is found in northern Madagascar.

Antennae are dark grey, the forewings are mouse-grey with six black spots
By its forewings it remembers Ethmia pylonotella (Viette, 1956) that is smaller in size.

The types provided from the Montagne d'Ambre in northern Madagascar (Diana), 01-06.xii.1958

References

Moths described in 1963
deconfiturella
Moths of Madagascar
Moths of Africa